The 1992 Survivor Series was the sixth annual Survivor Series professional wrestling pay-per-view (PPV) event produced by the World Wrestling Federation (WWF, now WWE). It took place on November 25, 1992, at the Richfield Coliseum in Richfield Township, Ohio, which was the third time a Survivor Series was held there after the 1987 and 1988 events. It was the first Survivor Series to have only one match with the namesake elimination tag team match while the remaining matches were one-on-one and standard tag team matches.

In the main event, Bret Hart retained his WWF World Heavyweight Championship against Shawn Michaels. The card also included a highly promoted match in which the team of Randy Savage and Mr. Perfect defeated the team of Ric Flair and Razor Ramon by disqualification; The Ultimate Warrior was advertised for the show but left the company and was replaced by Perfect. Also featured were two speciality matches: The Undertaker won a coffin match against Kamala, and The Big Boss Man defeated Nailz in a nightstick on a pole match.

Some of the matches were changed after they were first announced, as several wrestlers left the WWF shortly before the event. The main event, and the tag team match won by Savage and Perfect, garnered praise.

Production

Background
Survivor Series is an annual gimmick pay-per-view (PPV), produced every November by the World Wrestling Federation (WWF, now WWE) since 1987. In what has become the second longest running pay-per-view event in history (behind WWE's WrestleMania), it is one of the promotion's original four pay-per-views, along with WrestleMania, Royal Rumble, and SummerSlam, which were dubbed the "Big Four". The event is traditionally characterized by having Survivor Series matches, which are tag team elimination matches that typically pits teams of four or five wrestlers against each other. The 1992 event was the sixth event in the Survivor Series chronology and was the first in which the card was not dominated by Survivor Series matches; only one such match was scheduled to occur at the 1992 event. The event was scheduled to be held on November 25, 1992, at the Richfield Coliseum in Richfield Township, Ohio.

Storylines
The card included matches that resulted from scripted storylines, where wrestlers portrayed heroes, villains, or less distinguishable characters in scripted events that built tension and culminated in a wrestling match or series of matches. Results were predetermined by WWF's writers, with storylines produced on their weekly television shows.

In the storyline behind the match between The Big Boss Man and Nailz, Nailz claimed that while he was serving time in prison, the Big Boss Man, who was a guard at the prison, mistreated Nailz. In early 1992, Nailz appeared in introductory vignettes to talk about his hatred of the Big Boss Man. Upon his debut in the WWF, Nailz attacked Bossman and stole his nightstick, which he used to attack his opponents over the following months.

Shortly after Tatanka's debut in the WWF, he became involved in a feud with Rick Martel. They faced each other at WrestleMania VIII, and Tatanka defeated Martel. The following month, Martel gained revenge by attacking Tatanka with an atomizer of cologne and stealing the eagle feathers that Tatanka carried to symbolize his Lumbee heritage.

Ric Flair and his "executive consultant" Mr. Perfect had been allies in the WWF for much of 1992. After Flair lost the WWF World Heavyweight Championship to Macho Man Randy Savage at WrestleMania VIII, Flair and Perfect continued their feud with Savage. They interfered in Savage's match at SummerSlam and caused him to lose by countout. The rivalry continued, and Flair received assistance from Perfect and Razor Ramon to win the title back from Savage on September 1, which aired on the September 14 edition of WWF Prime Time Wrestling. The WWF planned for Savage to team with The Ultimate Warrior in a match against Flair and Ramon at Survivor Series, but Bobby Heenan announced at the end of Saturday Night's Main Event XXXI that he had been informed either Savage or Warrior was going to have a new tag team partner. The Ultimate Warrior left the WWF before the match could take place. Two possible reasons have been given for his departure. The first states that he was fired due to allegations of steroid abuse, while the other states that he was upset with the WWF's future plans for his character. The WWF was forced to change the plan and decided to turn Perfect into a babyface (fan favorite) from a heel. Perfect and Flair began having conflicts while teaming together, and Perfect accepted Savage's offer on the November 16 episode of WWF Prime Time Wrestling to team with him at Survivor Series.

Money Inc. ("Million Dollar Man" Ted DiBiase and Irwin R. Schyster) had been feuding with The Natural Disasters (Earthquake and Typhoon) since February 1992 when manager Jimmy Hart turned on Earthquake and Typhoon in favor of helping Money, Inc. With Hart's assistance, Money, Inc. defeated the Legion of Doom for the WWF Tag Team Championship on February 7, 1992. Five months later, Earthquake and Typhoon defeated Money Inc. to win the championship. The Natural Disasters were also feuding with The Beverly Brothers (Beau Beverly and Blake Beverly) and defeated them in a title match at SummerSlam 1992. A match was then announced for Survivor Series in which The Natural Disasters would team with The Bushwhackers (Bushwhacker Luke and Bushwhacker Butch) to face Money, Inc. and the Beverly Brothers. However, when The Nasty Boys (Brian Knobbs and Jerry Sags), also managed by Hart, were scheduled to face The Natural Disasters for the title on October 13, Hart replaced The Nasty Boys at the last minute with Money, Inc., who went on to regain the championship with help from The Headshrinkers. This led to a break-up between Hart and the Nasty Boys, who received the Bushwhackers' spot in the Survivor Series match to get revenge against Jimmy Hart and Money, Inc.

At SummerSlam 1992 in August, The Undertaker defeated Kamala. Harvey Wippleman, Kamala's manager wanted revenge, so a rematch was scheduled for Survivor Series. The match was promoted as the WWF's first coffin match, in which the winner would place the loser in a coffin after the match.

The WWF also planned a match featuring The British Bulldog defending the WWF Intercontinental Championship against The Mountie at Survivor Series. The WWF released Smith due to steroid allegations, however, and he was made to drop the title belt to Shawn Michaels on the November 14 episode of Saturday Night's Main Event XXXI. Ultimately, the WWF neglected to include an Intercontinental Championship match on the card as Michaels was already scheduled to challenge Bret Hart for the WWF Championship at Survivor Series. In this match, Hart's title was defended while Michaels' title was not.

Event

Prior to the pay-per-view broadcast, Crush defeated the Repo Man via submission. 

In the first televised match, High Energy (Owen Hart and Koko B. Ware) faced The Headshrinkers (Samu and Fatu). Samu used his strength advantage to control the opening of the match against Hart. Ware entered the match and gained the advantage over both opponents until he attempted to knock The Headshrinkers' heads against each other. According to WWF storylines, Samoans like The Headshrinkers have thick skulls and cannot be hurt in the head; as a result, The Headshrinkers no-sold the attack. Afa, The Headshrinkers' manager, attacked Ware while the referee was distracted. Samu and Fatu took turns attacking Ware, and Fatu performed a thrust kick on Ware. The Headshrinkers used rulebreaking tactics to control the match until Hart was able to enter the match. He performed dropkicks from the top rope against both Headshrinkers. As he tried to attack Samu from the top rope again, Samu caught him and powerslammed him before Fatu executed a diving splash to get the pinfall victory.

The next match, between The Big Boss Man and Nailz, was a nightstick on a pole match. A nightstick was suspended above the ring and could be used as a weapon once it was retrieved. Nailz began the match by attempting to get the nightstick, but Boss Man stopped him. Nailz choked Boss Man before making another unsuccessful attempt to climb the pole and obtain the nightstick. Boss Man punched Nailz and then tried to climb the pole. Nailz stopped him, performed a back body drop, and choked Boss Man again. Boss Man regained control but missed a splash, which gave Nailz another chance to retrieve the nightstick. Both men clotheslined each other, but Boss Man recovered first and got the nightstick. He hit Nailz with it, but Nailz took it and used it against Boss Man. Boss Man performed the Boss Man slam, his finishing move, before pinning Nailz to win the match.

Tatanka controlled the opening of the next match against "The Model" Rick Martel with several throws and dropkicks. Martel responded by wearing Tatanka down with a front facelock. Tatanka escaped, but Martel used another front facelock almost immediately. He performed a neckbreaker on Tatanka before going back to the same hold as before. Tatanka gained the advantage by performing a clothesline on Martel. Martel ran at Tatanka, but Tatanka moved out of the way and Martel hit his shoulder against the ring post. Tatanka focused on attacking Martel's injured shoulder but eventually was thrown out of the ring by Martel. Martel's advantage was short-lived, as Tatanka performed a series of backhand chops and a Tomahawk chop from the top rope before nailing The Model with a Samoan drop. Tatanka got the pinfall victory and retrieved his feathers from Martel after the match. While the match was in progress, a clown stood in the aisle and made balloon animals before popping them to upset the children in the audience.

In the next contest, Ric Flair and Razor Ramon wrestled against Mr. Perfect and Randy Savage. Ramon and Perfect began the match, but Flair entered after Perfect insulted him. Perfect threw Flair into the corner, and Flair's momentum carried him over the top rope to the ring apron. Savage attacked Flair and then took Perfect's place in the ring to maintain the advantage over Flair. From outside the ring, Ramon hit Savage with his knee and Flair and Ramon took turns attacking Savage's knee. While Ramon performed a half Boston crab on Savage, Perfect considered leaving the match and abandoning Savage. Savage recovered briefly by trying to pin Flair, but Ramon performed a chokeslam on Savage. Ric Flair attempted to attack Savage from the top rope, but Savage threw him to the ring floor instead. Perfect executed a neckbreaker and an atomic drop on Ramon. Outside of the ring, Flair attacked Savage with a chair. The referee was knocked unconscious, and Perfect tried to pin Ramon by performing a PerfectPlex. Because no referee was available to count the pinfall, a substitute referee came to the ring. The first referee recovered as Perfect attempted to pin Flair with a PerfectPlex. Flair escaped the pin attempt, and he and Ramon attacked Perfect until the referees were unable to keep the match under control. As a result, Ramon and Flair were disqualified, and the victory was awarded to Perfect and Savage.

In the next match, Virgil faced Yokozuna, who was billed at 505 pounds and making his pay-per-view debut. Virgil was unable to knock Yokozuna down with several dropkicks. Yokozuna performed a savate kick on Virgil before throwing him to the ring floor twice. He executed a legdrop on Virgil, but Virgil regained the advantage when Yokozuna accidentally ran into the ring pole while trying to attack Virgil. Yokozuna won the match after a splash in the corner and a Banzai Drop.

The following match was the only Survivor Series elimination match of the pay-per-view, in which The Natural Disasters (Earthquake and Typhoon) teamed with the Nasty Boys (Jerry Sags and Brian Knobbs) to face Money Inc. (Ted DiBiase and Irwin R. Schyster) and the Beverly Brothers (Beau Beverly and Blake Beverly). The rules stated that when any man was eliminated, his tag team partner would also be eliminated. Blake Beverly and Typhoon began the match, but Beau and Earthquake soon entered the ring as well. The Natural Disasters gained control of the match by attacking Blake Beverly, and the Nasty Boys entered the ring to assist the Disasters. Blake attacked Sags and tagged out of the match. Beau entered but was bodyslammed by Sags; Sags got distracted, however, which allowed Beau to suplex him and bring DiBiase into the match. Money Inc. took turns attacking Sags until Earthquake entered the ring. Earthquake performed an Earthquake splash by sitting on Beau Beverly to pin him and eliminate both Beverly Brothers. Earthquake fought DiBiase, but both men eventually left the ring and were replaced by their partners. Typhoon performed a splash on Schyster but was tripped by DiBiase. Schyster pinned Typhoon to eliminate The Natural Disasters. While Schyster was celebrating, Sags quickly pinned him to win the match for the Nasty Boys.

The coffin match, in which The Undertaker faced Kamala, came next. Kamala began the match by running in fear from The Undertaker. He gained the early advantage, however, by suddenly turning around and attacking The Undertaker. Kamala bodyslammed The Undertaker three times and performed three splashes. In an attempt to revive The Undertaker, Paul Bearer, his manager, held up an urn that was said to be the source of The Undertaker's power. Kim Chee, one of Kamala's handler's attacked Bearer. The Undertaker picked up the urn, which had rolled into the ring, and hit Kamala with it. The Undertaker pinned Kamala to win the match, placed him in a coffin, and nailed the lid shut.

In the main event of the card, Bret Hart defended his WWF World Heavyweight Championship against Shawn Michaels. Hart controlled the beginning of the match by repeatedly executing armdrags and armbars but Michaels gained the advantage when "The Hitman" missed a charge into the corner and collided shoulder-first with the ring post. Michaels then threw Hart into another ring post and wore him down by executing a front facelock. Hart was able to avoid Michaels' first attempt at his finisher, the modified back suplex, and rallied with his trademark moves including an elbow from the second rope, running bulldog and a superplex. Michaels recovered and performed a superkick on Hart and was able this time to apply his suplex, but Hart kicked out. After Hart missed a desperation crossbody and crotched himself on the ropes, Shawn attempted a dropkick from the middle rope but Hart grabbed Michaels' legs and applied the Sharpshooter, his finishing move. He retained his championship by forcing Michaels to submit.

Reception
Survivor Series 1992 was attended by 17,500 fans, the same number as the previous year. It drew more fans than any of the following three Survivor Series event would draw. The pay-per-view buyrate was 1.4, which means that 1.4 percent of households to which the event was available purchased the pay-per-view. This was, to that point, the lowest buyrate in Survivor Series history and down more than one-third from the previous year's 2.2 buyrate. The buyrate was higher than that of any of the following twelve Survivor Series events, however.

Dave Meltzer awarded the main event 4.5 stars out of five, while giving the Flair/Ramon vs. Savage/Perfect tag team match 3.25 stars. The remaining matches received 2.25 stars or lower, with Kamala vs. The Undertaker being an unrated "dud". Writing for The History of WWE, Matt Pettycord stated that the event was "pretty decent" considering that The Mountie, Davey Boy Smith, and the Ultimate Warrior left the company shortly before the event. On a five-star scale, he rated only the aforementioned tag team match and Hart vs. Michaels higher than one star. He stated that the event is "recommended, but not required", although the WWF World Heavyweight Championship match was a "must-see".

Adam Gutschmidt, reviewing the event for Online Onslaught, gave a rating of one-quarter star for the Nightstick on a Pole match and one-half star each for the High Energy vs. The Headshrinkers match and the Yokozuna vs. Virgil match. He enjoyed the WWF World Heavyweight Championship match, although he was disappointed by its lack of buildup prior to the event. He also felt that the Flair/Ramon vs. Savage/Perfect match was a good one until the ending got out of control. Brian Hoops of Pro Wrestling Torch agreed, stating that the WWF World Heavyweight Championship match was the highlight and that the Flair/Ramon vs. Savage/Perfect bout was also enjoyable: he recommended fast-forwarding through the rest of the show.

The event was released in North America on VHS by Coliseum Video on February 11, 1993. The VHS version was released in the United Kingdom on March 8, 1993. A DVD version is also available in the United Kingdom; it was packaged together with Survivor Series 1991 as part of the WWE Tagged Classics line and released on November 7, 2005.

Aftermath
Ric Flair and Mr. Perfect continued their feud, although Flair legitimately requested to be released from his WWF contract in order to return to World Championship Wrestling (WCW). His request was granted on the condition that he help build up Perfect as a credible babyface. The two men attacked each other during the battle royal at Royal Rumble 1993, and Perfect eliminated Flair from the match. The following night, Perfect defeated Flair in a loser leaves town match. Flair did not return to the WWF until McMahon purchased WCW in 2001.

The Undertaker's feud with Harvey Wippleman continued for several months after Survivor Series. At Royal Rumble 1993, Wippleman introduced a new wrestler named Giant Gonzalez. Despite not being scheduled in the match, Gonzalez attacked The Undertaker and eliminated him from the Royal Rumble match. The two men faced each other at WrestleMania IX, where Gonzalez was disqualified for attacking The Undertaker with a rag soaked in chloroform. Wippleman led Gonzalez and Mr. Hughes in another attack on The Undertaker, in which Hughes stole The Undertaker's urn. The feud was resolved at SummerSlam 1993, when The Undertaker defeated Gonzalez in a Rest in Peace match.

Yokozuna's push continued, and he won the battle royal main event at Royal Rumble 1993 to earn a WWF World Heavyweight Championship match against Bret Hart at WrestleMania IX. At WrestleMania, he defeated Hart to win the title belt. He immediately challenged Hulk Hogan to a match however, and WrestleMania ended with Yokozuna losing the WWF World Heavyweight Championship to Hogan in 21 seconds.

Kevin Wacholz, who had portrayed Nailz, left the WWF shortly after Survivor Series. Upset about his pay from SummerSlam 1992, he confronted WWF owner Vince McMahon and reportedly attacked him physically. He later testified against McMahon during a trial in which McMahon was accused of distributing steroids to wrestlers. Wacholz' statements have been reported as having a harmful effect on the prosecution's case because his anger at McMahon overshadowed his testimony.

Shawn Michaels became involved in a feud with his former tag team partner, Marty Jannetty. The team had split up earlier in the year when Michaels attacked Jannetty. Michaels defeated Jannetty at Royal Rumble 1993, but the two traded the Intercontinental Championship back and forth in subsequent rematches.

Hart and Michaels would again main-event Survivor Series five years later for the WWF World Heavyweight Championship with Hart defending; however, Michaels would win the title in controversial fashion.

Results

Survivor Series elimination match

References

External links
Official 1992 Survivor Series website
Results at Hoffco, Inc. 
Results at Online World of Wrestling

1992
Events in Ohio
1992 in Ohio
Professional wrestling in Richfield Township, Summit County, Ohio
1992 WWF pay-per-view events
November 1992 events in the United States